Terrance Cook (born December 20, 1982), better known by his stage name Drama, is an American Dirty South rapper, best known for his 1999 single "Left, Right, Left".

Musical work
Drama signed to Atlantic Records in 1999. He then released his debut single, "Left Right Left," which peaked at #73 on the Billboard Hot 100 and brought him to his early fame.

Soon after the release of his debut album Causin' Drama in February 2000, Drama was jailed for violating probation and was sentenced to 90 days in prison. The album peaked at #32 on the Billboard 200 on the chart week of April 1, 2000, backed by the popularity of "Left Right Left", and went on to be certified Gold by the RIAA. He was later released from prison, with the intention of working on new music. His song "Big Ball" is featured on the Osmosis Jones soundtrack. He released an album titled "Jean Wayne", on Tight 2 Def Music, on January 31, 2014.

Arrest 
In 2016, Drama was  arrested on July 28 for calling in a bomb threat to the law firm The Parks Group, run by "Real Housewives of Atlanta" celebrity cast member Phaedra Parks. The threat amounted to him carrying a package and making threats in the lobby, which affected The Lenox Building, an office building in Buckhead neighborhood.

The incident was proven a hoax, and Drama was charged with making terror threats and false reports, which all charges were dismissed.

Discography

Albums

Singles

References

Living people
Rappers from Alabama
People from Sylacauga, Alabama
Gangsta rappers
1981 births
21st-century American rappers